This article is about the composition of the Regional Council of Veneto, the legislative assembly of Veneto, during the XI Legislature, thus the term started in September 2020, following the 2020 regional election. Of the 51 members, 49 were elected in provincial constituencies by proportional representation using the largest remainder method with a Droop quota and open lists, while the remaining two were the elected President and the candidate for President who came second.

Roberto Ciambetti (Liga Veneta–Lega) is the current President of the Council (having served in that role also in 2015–2020), while Luca Zaia (Liga Veneta) serves as President of Veneto at the head of his third government.

Composition

Strength of political groups
Sources: Regional Council of Veneto – Groups and Regional Council of Veneto – Members

Members by party of election

Zaia President
Fabiano Barbisan 
Roberto Bet
Simona Bisaglia
Gianpaolo Bottacin 
Fabrizio Boron
Sonia Brescacin
Francesco Calzavara 
Silvia Cestaro
Elisa Cavinato
Giulio Centenaro
Roberto Ciambetti 
Nazzareno Gerolimetto
Stefano Giacomin
Silvia Maino
Gabriele Michieletto
Filippo Rigo 
Silvia Rizzotto
Luciano Sandonà
Francesca Scatto
Alessandra Sponda
Stefano Valdegamberi 
Roberta Vianello 
Alberto Villanova
Marco Zecchinato

Liga Veneta
Marco Andreoli 
Elisa De Berti 
Marco Dolfin
Federico Caner 
Milena Cecchetto 
Laura Cestari 
Cristiano Corazzari 
Enrico Corsi
Marzio Favero
Nicola Finco
Manuela Lanzarin 
Giacomo Possamai 
Giovanni Puppato 
Roberto Marcato 
Giuseppe Pan 
Luca Zaia

Democratic Party
Anna Maria Bigon
Vanessa Camani
Arturo Lorenzoni 
Jonatan Montanariello
Giacomo Possamai
Andrea Zanoni
Francesca Zottis

Brothers of Italy
Elena Donazzan 
Joe Formaggio 
Lucas Pavanetto 
Daniele Polato
Tommaso Razzolini
Raffaele Speranzon 
Enoch Soranzo

Forza Italia
Alberto Bozza
Elisa Venturini

Five Star Movement
Erika Baldin

Venetian Autonomy List
Tomas Piccinini

Veneto We Want
Elena Ostanel

Green Europe
Cristina Guarda

Election

Luca Zaia of Liga Veneta–Lega was re-elected President by a record 76.8% of the vote. Liga Veneta, which ran an official party list, a list named after Zaia and a third list in combination with Liga Veneta Repubblica, was confirmed the largest in the region with 63.9%. The Democratic Party came second with 11.9% and the Brothers of Italy third with 9.6%. The total score of Venetist parties was 65.5%, the highest ever.

References

Veneto,2020
Regional Council,2020
2020